St. Rose Music is a music management and publishing company representing a select and diverse roster of composers and artists. The company was founded in 1999 by Jim Keller and Philip Glass.

Current clients

Nico Muhly
Rufus Wainwright
Jeff Beal
Paul Leonard-Morgan
Ravi Shankar
Anoushka Shankar
Rachel Portman
Tom Waits

References

External links
 Website
 Facebook

Entertainment companies of the United States